The 2021 Iran Athletic Championship (Track and Field) were held in two days at Imam Khomeini stadium in Arak in 44 events for Men and Women. The competition had 100 world ranking points for the winner of each competition. In Men competition East Azarbaijan team took the overall results with 4 golds and 2 silvers. In Women competition Tehran team took overall result with 5 golds, 4 silvers and 1 bronze.

Men Results

Women Results

References

Iran Athletic Federation 2021 Men Championship Results.
Iran Athletic Federation 2021 Women Championship Results
ISNA Men Results first day. 
ISNA Women Results first day
IRNA Report  
IRNA Photo Report
ISNA Men Competition Photo Report
ISNA Women Competition Photo Report 

2021 in athletics (track and field)